Robert Hite (born 1984) is an American basketball player.

Robert Hite may also refer to:
Robert Hite (artist) (1956–2020), American visual artist
Robert L. Hite (1920–2015), World War II pilot, Doolittle Raider and prisoner of war
Wood Hite (Robert Woodson Hite, 1850–1881), outlaw and cousin of Frank and Jesse James
Bob Hite (1943–1981), musician
Bob Hite (announcer) (1914–2000), American radio and television announcer